The 2002 Alaska Aces season was the 17th season of the franchise in the Philippine Basketball Association (PBA).

Draft pick

Transactions

Finals stint
The Alaska Aces made it to the finals twice in the 2002 season, they lost to Purefoods TJ Hotdogs in seven games for the Governor's Cup title. After placing fourth in the Commissioner's Cup, the Aces reach the All-Filipino Cup finals with a 2-1 series win over top-seeded Red Bull Thunder in their best-of-three semifinals. Alaska went on to play the Coca-Cola Tigers in the championship, the Aces lost in four games to the first-year ballclub in the best-of-five finals series.

Roster

Elimination round

Games won

References

Alaska Aces (PBA) seasons
Alaska